Philip John George White (29 December 1930 – June 2000) was an English professional footballer who played as a winger in the Football League for Leyton Orient and in non-League football for Wealdstone.

References

1930 births
2000 deaths
Footballers from Fulham
English footballers
Association football midfielders
Leyton Orient F.C. players
Wealdstone F.C. players
English Football League players